Anthemia is a former municipality in Imathia, Greece. Since the 2011 local government reform it is part of the municipality Naousa, of which it is a municipal unit. The municipal unit has an area of 74.638 km2. Population 7,534 (2011). The seat of the municipality was in Kopanos.

References

Populated places in Imathia